The 1998 Winter Olympics, officially known as the XVIII Olympic Winter Games, was a winter multi-sport event held in Nagano, Japan, from 7 to 22 February 1998. A total of 2,176 athletes representing 72 National Olympic Committees (NOCs) participated in the Games in 68 events across 14 disciplines.

The discipline of snowboarding made its debut, with four events contested, two for men and two for women. Additionally, the Olympic program saw the addition of a women's tournament in ice hockey, the first time that women had participated in that sport in Olympic history.  At the time, it was believed that curling made its debut as a medal event, having been a demonstration sport three times at the 1932, 1988, and 1992 Winter Olympics;  however, in 2006, the International Olympic Committee ruled that the 1924 Olympic tournament in Chamonix, France, had been an official medal event, retroactively making the Nagano tournament the second time curling has been contested for official medals.

Germany won the most medals, with 29, and the most gold medals, with 12.  Norway finished second in both tallies, with 10 gold medals and 25 medals of all colors. Of the 72 NOCs to participate at Nagano, 24 won at least one medal, 15 of those won at least one gold medal. Denmark, participating in a Winter Olympic Games for the ninth time, won its first-ever medal at a Winter Olympics. Bulgaria and the Czech Republic won their first Winter Olympic gold medals in Nagano.  The Czech Republic had previously won two gold medals as part of Czechoslovakia, and Bulgaria had won a bronze medal in the 1980 Winter Olympics.

Larisa Lazutina of Russia won five medals, the most of any competitor; she won three golds, a silver, and a bronze medal in cross-country skiing, winning a medal in every women's event in her sport. Norwegian cross-country skier Bjørn Dæhlie won four medals, including three golds. A further nine competitors earned three medals apiece, with forty-seven total individuals winning multiple medals.

Alpine skiing

Biathlon

Bobsleigh

Cross-country skiing

Curling

Figure skating

Freestyle skiing

Ice hockey

Luge

Nordic combined

Short track speed skating

Ski jumping

Snowboarding

Speed skating

Multiple medalists
Athletes who won three or more medals during the 1998 Winter Olympics are listed below.

Notes
 No bronze medal was awarded in this event because two competitors tied for second place with a time of 1 minute, 35.43 seconds.
 No silver medal was awarded in this event because Italy and Canada tied for first place with a time of 3 minutes, 37.24 seconds.

See also
1998 Winter Olympics medal table

References

External links

Medal winners
1998